Teresa A. Garman (née Lennon; August 29, 1937) is an American politician in the state of Iowa.

Garman was born in Webster County, Iowa. A Republican, she served in the Iowa House of Representatives from 1987 to 2003 (87th district from 1987 to 1993 and 63rd district from 1993 to 2003).

References

1937 births
Living people
People from Webster County, Iowa
Farmers from Iowa
Women state legislators in Iowa
Republican Party members of the Iowa House of Representatives
21st-century American women